Peter Flicker (born 14 August 1964) is an Austrian football manager and former player who currently manages SC Columbia Floridsdorf.

External links
 

1974 births
Living people
Austrian footballers
Austrian football managers
Floridsdorfer AC players
FC Admira Wacker Mödling players
TSV Hartberg players
Association football defenders
Floridsdorfer AC managers